Rescue organization can refer to:

Animal rescue group
Wildlife rehabilitation
Search and rescue organization, for people